Lučenec–Kalonda–Veľký Krtíš railway is a railway line on the Southern part of Slovakia. It is a corridor line with Hungary. It uses part of MÁV’s Line 78 between Ipolytarnóc and Nógrádszakál. It is signed as No 161 in the Slovakian railway system. Only freight trains use the line up to Veľký Krtíš. As of 2013 there is no passenger transport in the Slovakian part of the line.

References 

Railway lines in Slovakia